Territorial Assembly elections were held in French Cameroons on 30 March 1952.

Electoral system
At the time of the election, the Territorial Assembly had 50 seats, of which 18 were elected by the first college and 32 were elected by the second college.

Campaign
A total of 303 candidates ran for the 50 seats; 65 candidates contested the 18 seats in the first college and 238 candidates contested the 32 seats in the second college.

Results
Of the 7,788 voters in the first college, 4,300 cast votes, whilst in the second college, 330,000 of the 520,605 registered voters voted.

References

1952 elections in Africa
1952
1952 in French Cameroon
1952
March 1952 events in Africa